Ísleifs þáttr biskups (The Tale of Bishop Ísleifr) is a short Old Norse-Icelandic narrative which recounts two episodes from the life of Ísleifr Gizurason, the first bishop of Iceland. The first episode recounts Ísleifr's meeting with St Ólafr in Norway. Ísleifr is introduced to Ólafr by Brandr Vermundarson, who gives Ísleifr a cloak previously gifted to him by the king. The second part of the narrative gives an account of Ísleifr's marriage to Dalla Þorvaldsdóttir.

The þáttr is preserved in Flateyjarbók, where it is interpolated in Óláfs saga helga, in AM 753 fol. no. 5, a now fragmentary 15th century vellum manuscript, and AM 554h α 4to., a 17th century paper copy of AM 753 fol. no. 5.

Bibliography

Manuscripts 

 GkS 1005 fol. (Flateyjarbók) - ca. 1400
 AM 75e fol. no. 5 - 15th century
 MS AM 554h α 4to. - 17th century

Editions 

 

 

 

  [only includes the account of Íseifr's marriage to Dalla Þorvaldsdóttir]

Translations 

  [Latin translation]

 

  [Reprint of the above]

 

  [Danish translation]

References 

Bishops' sagas